The 1958–59 season was Manchester United's 57th season in the Football League, and their 14th consecutive season in the top division of English football. It was the first season of a revamped United side which was being rebuilt following the Munich air disaster in the February of the previous season which had claimed the lives of eight players. The most notable addition to the squad for the new season as forward Albert Quixall, a pre-season signing from Sheffield Wednesday.

The season saw the retirement of centre-half Jackie Blanchflower as a result of the injuries he suffered in the Munich crash.

Munich crash survivor Bobby Charlton was United's top scorer this season with 29 league goals, while fellow survivor Albert Scanlon was also impressive with 16 goals from the left wing.

The new look United side finished second in the league this season.

First Division

FA Cup

Squad statistics

References

Manchester United F.C. seasons
Manchester United